Canadian Dimension (CD) is a Canadian left-wing magazine founded in 1963 by Cy Gonick, and published out on Winnipeg, Manitoba, four times a year. It reported circulation of 3,500 copies in 2013.

Canadian Dimension is a forum for left-wing political thoughts that ranges from New Democratic Party–style social democracy to libertarian socialism.

History 
The magazine was founded in 1963 by Cy Gonick, and a collective took over editorial responsibility in 1975. Its editorial collective is a group of over 30 writers and activists who reside in major cities across Canada. Gonick acts as coordinating editor and publisher.

CD provides a forum for debate on topics such as socialism vs social democracy and features activist reports from all over Canada, trade unionist reports, and reviews of books, films, websites, CDs, and videos.

Canadian Dimension draws on a wide spectrum of writers on the left. Some of the earliest contributors included Charles Taylor, George Grant, Gad Horowitz, C. B. Macpherson, Kari Levitt, John Warnock, James Laxer, Leo Panitch and Reg Whitaker. More recently, frequent contributors have included the likes of Bryan Palmer, Sam Gindin, Andrea Levy, Peter Kulchyski, Yves Engler, Joel Kovel, and Ian Angus.

Canadian Dimension has always regarded itself as a socialist publication though the scope of its socialism has evolved very considerably. In 1963, it did not feature topics of feminism, the environment, human rights, gay and lesbian liberation, and the connection between the politics that are espoused and the way its proponents live their lives. By the 1980s these topics were commonly featured.

An editorial written on the occasion of its 30th anniversary, "CD at 30" concluded that

Over the past decade, the format of the magazine changed radically with part of every issue being focused on a different theme – themes such as Cities, Indian Country, Arts and Politics, Food, Pensions in Peril, Queer, Remembering 1968, Immigration, the Criminal (Justice) System, precarious work, big media, Canada mines the South, the New Feminist Revolution, Our Winnipeg, Today's Student Activism, climate change, peak oil, and degrowth.

References

External links
 

1963 establishments in Manitoba
Bi-monthly magazines published in Canada
Political magazines published in Canada
Magazines established in 1963
Magazines published in Manitoba
Mass media in Winnipeg
Socialist magazines